IEEE Photonics Journal is a bimonthly peer-reviewed open access scientific journal published by the Institute of Electrical and Electronics Engineers (IEEE). It was established in 2009. The editor-in-chief is Gabriella Cincotti (Roma Tre University).

Abstracting and indexing 
The journal is abstracted and indexed in:
PubMed
Science Citation Index Expanded
Scopus

According to the Journal Citation Reports, the journal has a 2021 impact factor of 2.250, ranking it 164th out of 276 journals in the category "Engineering, Electrical & Electronic" and 60th out of 101 journals in the category "Optics".

References

External links

Optics journals
IEEE academic journals
Publications established in 2009
Bimonthly journals
English-language journals
Open access journals
Creative Commons-licensed journals